Tokzhan Bekpenbetova (Toqjan Bekpenbetova; born 18 May 1994) is a Kazakhstani footballer who plays as a forward for Women's Championship club FC Okzhetpes and the Kazakhstan women's national team.

Before moving to Ukraine she played for ShVSM-Kairat and Okzhetepes. At the women's Champions League, she had 1 game: on November 4, 2020 she played all 120 minutes in a lost (1:2) home match against the Georgian Lanchkhutiі. In 2020 she became the silver medalist of the championship of Kazakhstan as part of "Okzhetpes".

In July 2021 she moved to Ukraine, where she signed an agreement with Voskhod. In the shirt of the club from Staraya Mayachka, she made her debut on July 31, 2021 in a draw (1:1) home match of the 1st round against Kryvbas. Tokzhan entered the field in the starting lineup, and in the sixty-sixth minute she was replaced by Kristina Romanova.

As a member of women's youth team of Kazakhstan (WU-19), she made her debut on September 17, 2011 in the lost (0:3) match of the 1st round of the group stage of the women's youth European championship against peers from Wales. Bekpenbet entered the field on the sixty-second minute, replacing Zulfiya Mirzaev. At the European Youth Women's Championship she entered the field in 3 games.

As a member of the national team of Kazakhstan, she made her debut on June 2, 2016 in the victorious (1:0) match of the European Women's Championship against Israel. Tokzhan entered the field on the sixty-third minute, replacing Ksenia Khairulin.

References

1994 births
Living people
Women's association football forwards
Kazakhstani women's footballers
Kazakhstan women's international footballers